Beta-1,4 N-acetylgalactosaminyltransferase 1 is an enzyme that in humans is encoded by the B4GALNT1 gene.

GM2 and GD2 gangliosides are sialic acid-containing glycosphingolipids. GalNAc-T is the enzyme involved in the biosynthesis of G(M2) and G(D2) glycosphingolipids. GalNAc-T catalyzes the transfer of GalNAc into G(M3) and G(D3) by a beta-1,4 linkage, resulting in the synthesis of G(M2) and G(D2), respectively.

References

External links

Further reading